Nagatsuma (written: 長妻) is a Japanese surname. Notable people with the surname include:

, Japanese politician
, Japanese voice actress
Tadao Nagatsuma, American engineer

Japanese-language surnames